The European Green Deal, approved in 2020, is a set of policy initiatives by the European Commission with the overarching aim of making the European Union (EU) climate neutral in 2050. An impact assessed plan will also be presented to increase the EU's greenhouse gas emission reductions target for 2030 to at least 50% and towards 55% compared with 1990 levels. The plan is to review each existing law on its climate merits, and also introduce new legislation on the circular economy, building renovation, biodiversity, farming and innovation.

The president of the European Commission, Ursula von der Leyen, stated that the European Green Deal would be Europe's "man on the moon moment". Von der Leyen appointed Frans Timmermans as Executive Vice President of the European Commission for the European Green Deal. On 13 December 2019, the European Council decided to press ahead with the plan, with an opt-out for Poland. On 15 January 2020, the European Parliament voted to support the deal as well, with requests for higher ambition.

The European Commission's climate change strategy, launched in 2020, is focused on a promise to make Europe a net-zero emitter of greenhouse gases by 2050 and to demonstrate that economies will develop without increasing resource usage. However, the Green Deal has measures to ensure that nations that are already reliant on fossil fuels are not left behind in the transition to renewable energy. The green transition is a top priority for Europe. The EU Member States want to reduce greenhouse gas emissions by 55% by 2030 from 1990 levels, and become climate neutral by 2050.

European Climate Pact
The European Climate Pact is an initiative of the European Commission supporting the implementation of the European Green Deal. It is a movement to build a greener Europe, providing a platform to work and learn together, develop solutions, and achieve real change.

The Pact provides opportunities for people, communities, and organizations to participate in climate and environmental action across Europe. By pledging to the Pact, European stakeholders commit to taking concrete climate and environmental actions in a way that can be measured and/or followed up. Participating in the Pact is an opportunity for organizations to share their transition journey with their peers and collaborate with other actors towards common targets.

Aims
The overarching aim of the European Green Deal is for the European Union to become the world's first “climate-neutral bloc” by 2050. It has goals extending to many different sectors, including construction, biodiversity, energy, transport and food.

The plan includes potential carbon tariffs for countries that don't curtail their greenhouse gas pollution at the same rate. The mechanism to achieve this is called the Carbon Border Adjustment Mechanism (CBAM). It also includes:
 a circular economy action plan, The European Commission has released a number of publications on circular economy, including one that requires Member States to carry out activities related to changing their economies into circular economies. The CE has indeed become a key component of the European Green Deal and the Coronavirus Recovery Plan of the Von der Leyen Commission (2019–present), and it was a key component of the Junker Commission's ambition to create a sustainable, low-carbon, resource-efficient, and competitive economy.
 a review and possible revision (where needed) of the all relevant climate-related policy instruments, including the Emissions Trading System,
 a Farm to Fork strategy along with a focus shift from compliance to performance (which will reward farmers for managing and storing carbon in the soil, improved nutrient management, reducing emissions, ...),
 a revision of the Energy Taxation Directive which is looking closely at fossil fuel subsidies and tax exemptions (aviation, shipping),
 a sustainable and smart mobility strategy and 
an EU forest strategy. The latter will have as its key objectives effective afforestation, and forest preservation and restoration in Europe.

It also leans on Horizon Europe, to play a pivotal role in leveraging national public and private investments. Through partnerships with industry and member States, it will support research and innovation on transport technologies, including batteries, clean hydrogen, low-carbon steel making, circular bio-based sectors and the built environment.

The EU plans to finance the policies set out in the Green Deal through an investment plan – InvestEU, which forecasts at least €1 trillion in investment. Furthermore, for the EU to reach its goals set out in the deal, it is estimated that approximately €260 billion a year is going to be required by 2030 in investments.

Before 1970, almost half of all European residential structures were built. At the time, no consideration was given to the amount of energy used by materials and standards. At the present rate of refurbishment, reaching a highly energy-efficient and decarbonised building stock might take more than a century. One of the major aims of the European Green Deal is to “at least double or even triple” the current refurbishment rate of approximately 1%. This is also true outside of the EU. In addition to rehabilitation, investment is required to enable the development of new efficient and ecologically friendly structures.

In July 2021, the European Commission released its “Fit for 55” legislation package, which contains important guidelines for the future of the automotive industry: All new cars sold in the EU must be zero-emission vehicles from 2035.

In the context of the Paris Agreement, and therefore using today's emissions as baseline, since 1990 EU emissions already dropped by 25% at 2019, a 55% reduction target using 1990 as baseline represents in 2019 terms a 40% reduction target, which can be calculated using this equation: 

According to the Emissions Gap Report 2020 by the United Nations Environment Programme, meeting the Paris Agreement's 1.5 °C temperature increase target (with 66% probability) requires GtCO2e 34/59 = 57% emissions reduction globally from 2019 levels by 2030, therefore well above the 40% target of the European Green Deal. This 57% emission reduction target at 2030 represents average global reductions, while advanced economies are expected to contribute more.

Policy areas

Clean energy 
Climate neutrality by the year of 2050 is the main goal of the European Green Deal. For the EU to reach their target of climate neutrality, one goal is to decarbonise their energy system by aiming to achieve “net-zero greenhouse gas emissions by 2050.” Their relevant energy directive is intended to be looked over and adjusted if problem areas arise. Many other in place and present regulations will also be reviewed. In 2023, the Member states will update their climate and national energy plans to adhere to the EU's climate goal for 2030. 
The key principles include: 
 to “prioritise energy efficiency”
 to “develop a power sector based largely on renewable resources”,
 to secure an affordable EU energy supply
 and to have a “fully integrated, interconnected digitalised EU energy market.”
In 2020, the European Commission unveiled its strategy for a greener, cleaner energy future.
The EU Strategy for Energy System Integration serves as a framework for an energy transition, which comprises measures to achieve a more circular system, and measures to implement greater direct electrification as well as to develop clean fuels (including hydrogen). The European Clean Hydrogen Alliance has also been launched as hydrogen has a special role to play in this seismic shift.

Sustainable industry 
Another target area to achieve the EU's climate goals is the introduction of the Circular Economy Industrial policy. In March 2020, the EU announced their Industrial Strategy with its aim to “empower citizens, revitalises regions and have the best technologies.” Key points of this policy area include boosting the modern aspects of industries, influencing the exploration and creation of “climate neutral” circular economy friendly goods markets. This further entails the “decarbonisation and modernisation of energy-intensive industries such as steel and cement.”

A ‘Sustainable products’ policy is also projected to be introduced which will focus on reducing the wastage of materials. This aims to ensure products will be reused and recycling processes will be reinforced. The materials particularly focused on include “textiles, construction, vehicles, batteries, electronics and plastics.” The European Union is also of the opinion that it "should stop exporting its waste outside of the EU" and it will therefore "revisit the rules on waste shipments and illegal exports" The EU also mentioned that "the Commission will also propose to revise the rules on end-of-life vehicles with a view to promoting more circular business models. The European Commission estimates that up to 2030, Europe's green investment offensive will cost an additional €350 billion annually.

Building and renovation 
This policy area is targeting the process of building and renovation in regards to their currently unsustainable methods. Many non-renewable resources are used in the process as well. Thus, the plan focuses on promoting the use of energy efficient building methods such as climate proofing buildings, increasing digitalisation and enforcing rules surrounding the energy performance of buildings. Social housing renovation will also occur in order to reduce the price of energy bills for those less able to finance these costs. They aim to triple the renovation rate of all buildings to reduce the pollution emitted during these processes.

Digital technologies are important in achieving the European Green Deal's environmental targets. Emerging digital technologies, if correctly applied, have the potential to play a critical role in addressing environmental issues. Smart city mobility, precision agriculture, sustainable supply chains, environmental monitoring, and catastrophe prediction are just a few examples.

Farm to Fork 
The ‘From Farm to Fork’ strategy pursues the issue of food sustainability as well as the support allocated to the producers, i.e. farmers and fishermen. The methods of production and transfer of these resources are what the E.U. considers a climate-friendly approach, aiming to increase efficiency as well. The price and quality of the goods will aim to not be hindered during these newly adopted processes. Specific target areas include reducing the use of chemical pesticides, increasing the availability of health food options and aiding consumers to understand the health ratings of products and sustainable packaging.

In the official page of the program From Farm to Fork is cited Frans Timmermans the Executive Vice-president of the European Commission, saying that:

The program includes the next targets:

 Making 25% of EU agriculture organic, by 2030.
 Reduce by 50% the use of pesticides by 2030.
 Reduce the use of Fertilizers by 20% by 2030.
 Reduce nutrient loss by at least 50%.
 Reduce the use of antimicrobials in agriculture and antimicrobials in aquaculture by 50% by 2030.
 Create sustainable food labeling.
 Reduce food waste by 50% by 2030.
 Dedicate to R&I related to the issue €10 billion.

Eliminating pollution 
The ‘Zero Pollution Action Plan’ that aims to be adopted by the commission in 2021 intends to achieve no pollution from “all sources”, cleaning the air, water and soil by 2050. The Environment Quality standards are to be fully met, enforcing all industrial activities to be within toxic-free environments. Agricultural and urban industries water management policies will be overlooked to suit the “no harm” policy. Harmful resources such as micro-plastics and chemicals, such as pharmaceuticals, that are threatening the environment aim to be substituted in order to reach this goal. The ‘Farm to Fork’ strategy aids pollution reduction from excess nutrients and sustainable methods of production and transportation.

Some formulations of the plan such as "toxic-free" and "zero pollution" have been criticized by Genetic Literacy Project as anti-scientific and contradictory, as any substance can be toxic at specific dose, and almost any life-related process results in "pollution".

Sustainable mobility 
A reduction in emissions from transportation methods is another target area within the European Green Deal. A comprehensive strategy on "Sustainable and Smart mobility" intends to be implemented. This will increase the adoption of sustainable and alternative fuels in road, maritime and air transport and fix the emission standards for combustion-engine vehicles. It also aims to make sustainable alternative solutions available to businesses and the public. Smart traffic management systems and applications intend to be developed as a solution. Freight delivery methods aim to be altered, with preferred pathways being by land or water. Public transport alterations aim to reduce public congestion as well as pollution. Installations of charging ports for electric vehicles intends to encourage the purchase of low-emission vehicles. The ‘Single European Sky’ plan focuses on air traffic management in order to increase safety, flight efficiency and environmentally friendly conditions.

Biodiversity 
A strategy surrounding the protection of the European Union's biodiversity will be put forth in 2021. Management of forests and maritime areas, environment protection and addressing the issue of losses of species and ecosystems are all aspects of this target area.

Restoration of affected ecosystems is intended to occur through implementing organic farming methods, aiding pollination processes, restoring free flowing rivers, reducing pesticides that harm surrounding wildlife and reforestation. The EU wants to protect 30% of land and 30% of sea, whilst creating stricter safeguards around new and old growth forests. Their aim is to restore ecosystems and their biological levels.

The official page of the EU Biodiversity Strategy for 2030 cites Ursula von der Leyen, President of the European Commission, saying that:

The biodiversity strategy is an essential part of the climate change mitigation strategy of the European Union. From the 25% of the European budget that will go to fight climate change, a large portion of that will be dedicated to restoring biodiversity and nature based solutions.

The EU Biodiversity Strategy for 2030 includes the following targets:

 Protect 30% of the sea territory and 30% of land territory especially primary forests and old-growth forests. 
 Plant 3 billion trees by 2030.
 Restore at least 25,000 kilometers of rivers, so they will become free-flowing.
 Reduce the use of pesticides by 50% by 2030.
 Increase organic farming. 
 Increase biodiversity in agriculture.
 Reverse the decline of pollinators.
 Give €20 billion per year to the issue and make it part of the business practice.

According to the page, approximately half of the global GDP depends on nature. In Europe many parts of the economy that generate trillions € per year, depend on nature. Currently the benefits of Natura 2000 in Europe contribute €200 - €300 billion per year. Florika Fink-Hooijer, Director General of the Directorate-General for the Environment, said that the EU has the “ambition to be a standard setter" for global biodiversity policy.

Sustainable finance

Motivation 
The main aim of the European Green Deal is to become climate neutral by the year of 2050. The reasons pushing for the plan's creation are based upon the environmental issues such as climate change, a loss of biodiversity, ozone depletion, water pollution, urban stress, waste production and more. The following statistics highlight the climate related issues within the European Union:

 In regards to climate change, carbon dioxide levels are predicted to double by the year of 2030 with Europe's temperature expected to increase by 2-3 °C in the summer season.
 Europe is responsible for nearly one third of the world's gas emissions that deplete the ozone.
 More than 50% of all surface area where ecosystems are in Europe are presented with threats from management problems and stresses.
 On average, 700,000 hectares of woodland are burnt annually by fires “often caused by socioeconomic factors” within the European Union, leading to the degradation of forests.

Clean energy statistics 
 More than 75% of greenhouse gas emissions are related to the production and use of energy within the EU.
 Positive of renewable resources- Renewable resources sourced 17.5% of the EU's gross energy consumption in 2017.

Sustainable industry statistics 
 Studies showed that from the year of 1970 to 2017, the world's yearly extraction of resources tripled. This process is responsible for 90% of all loss in biodiversity.  
 The European Union's current industry is responsible for 20% of their greenhouse gas emissions.
 The current resources that originate from recycling methods is 12% within the European Union's industry.

Building and renovations statistics 
 The building and renovation methods used by the European Union use 40% of all energy consumed.

Farm to fork statistics 
 Within the European Union, “20% of food production is wasted” whilst “36 million of the population are unable to have quality meal every second day.”

Eliminating pollution statistics 
 From the 50,000 industrial locations in the EU, up to €189 billion is spent on health issues related to pollution from these installations.

Sustainable mobility statistics 
 25% of Greenhouse gas emissions result from transportation methods. Road transport takes 71.7% of this total, followed by 13.9% from Aviation, 13.4% from Water, with railways and other accumulating the remainder.
 The Single European Sky strategy is predicted to help reduce 10% of aviation emissions.

Biodiversity 

 Within the EU, €40 trillion depends on nature and its resources.
 The population of wild species has declined by over 50% on average in the last two generations.

All 54 actions were adopted or implemented by 2019. The EU is now recognised as a leader in circular economy policy making globally. The waste legislation was adopted in 2018, following negotiations with the European Parliament and Member States in the European Council. According to Eurostat, jobs related to circular economy activities have increased by 6% between 2012 and 2016 within the EU. The action plan has also encouraged at least 14 Member States, eight regions, and 11 cities to put forward circular economy strategies.

Timeline

 11 December 2019: The European Green Deal was presented.
 14 January 2020: The European Green Deal Investment Plan as well as the Just Transition Mechanism were presented.
 4 March 2020: There was a proposal for a European climate law to ensure a climate neutral European Union by 2050. A public consultation was held on the European Climate Pact (in regards to bringing together regions, local communities, civil society, business and schools).
 10 March 2020: The European Industrial Strategy was adopted (which is a plan for a future ready economy).
 11 March 2020: There was a proposal for a Circular Economy Action Plan that focused on sustainable resource use.
 20 May 2020: The ‘Farm to fork strategy’ was presented in order to increase the sustainability of food systems. The EU Biodiversity Strategy for 2030 was presented which focuses on the protection of fragile natural resources.
 8 July 2020: Adoption of the EU strategies for energy system integration and hydrogen to pave the way towards a fully decarbonised, more efficient and interconnected energy sector.
12 July 2020: The taxonomy for sustainable activities comes into force, to reduce greenwashing and help investors choose green options.
 17 September 2020: The 2030 Climate Target Plan was presented.
 9 December 2020: The European Climate Pact was launched.
14 July 2021: The "Fit for 55" Package was presented by the European Commission, containing a large number of legislation proposals to achieve the EU Green Deal.
5 April 2022:  Adoption of several initiatives under the action plan, including:
 legislative proposal for substantiating green claims made by companies 
 review of requirements on packaging and packaging waste in the EU 
 new policy framework on bio-based, biodegradable and compostable plastics 
 measures to reduce the impact of microplastic pollution on the environment.

Recovery program from the novel coronavirus 

With the 2020 COVID-19 pandemic spreading rapidly within the European Union, the focus on the European Green Deal diminished. Many leaders including the deputy minister, Kowalski, from Poland, a Romanian politician, and the Czech prime minister, Babiš, suggested either a yearly pause or a complete discontinuation of the deal. Many believe the current main focus of the European Union's current policymaking process should be the immediate, shorter-term crisis rather than climate change.

The financial market being under immense stress along with a reduction in economic activity is another factor threatening to derail the European Green Deal. Public and private funds for the policy as well as the EU's GDP being affected by COVID-19 both hinder the budgeting for the policy to take action.

However, as recovery processes have begun within the European Union, a large majority of ministers are supporting the push for the deal to begin, alongside the subsiding of the first wave of infections. Representatives from 17 governments signed a letter in mid-April pushing for the deal to continue as a “response to the economic crisis while transforming Europe into a sustainable and climate neutral economy.”

In April 2020, the European Parliament called for including the European Green Deal in its economic recovery program. Ten countries urged the European Union to adopt the “green recovery plan" as fears grew that the economic hit caused by the COVID-19 pandemic could weaken action on climate change.

In May 2020 the leaders of the European Commission argued that the ecological crisis helped create the pandemic, which emphasised the need to advance the European Green Deal. Later that month, the €750 billion European recovery package (called Next Generation EU) and the €1 trillion budget were announced. The European Green Deal is part of it. The money will be spent only on projects that meet certain green criteria. 25% of all funding will go to climate change mitigation. Fossil fuels and Nuclear power are excluded from the funding. The recovery package is also intended to restore some equilibrium between rich and poor countries in the European Union.

As part of the European Union response to the COVID-19 pandemic, several economic programs were set up, including the CRII, CRII+, European Social Fund+ and REACT-EU With these programs, flexibility is maintained, and CRII and CRII+ are also able to direct money to crisis repair measures through the European Regional Development Fund (ERDF), European Social Fund (ESF), Fund for European Aid to Most Deprived (FEAD) or the European Social Fund Plus. Some of these programs (such as REACT-EU) also serve to invest in the European Green Deal.

In July 2020, a proposed "Green Recovery Act" in the United Kingdom was published by a think tank and academic group, implementing all recommendations of a “Green New Deal” for Europe (which is distinct from the EU Green Deal) and drawing attention to the fact that "car manufacturers in Europe are far behind China" in ending fossil fuel-based production.

The same month, the recovery package and the budget of the European Union were generally accepted. The portion of the money that was allocated for climate action grew to 30%. The plan includes some green taxation on European products and on imports, but critics say it is still not enough for achieving the climate targets of the European Union and it is not clear how to ensure that all the money will really go to green projects.

History of opposition by countries 
Although all EU leaders signed off on the European green deal in December 2019, disagreements in regards to the goals and their timeline to achieve each factor arose. Poland has stated that climate neutrality by 2050 will not be a possibility for their country due to their reliance on coal as their main power source. Their climate minister, Michał Kurtyka, declared that commitments and funds need to be more fairly allocated. The initiative to increase the goal of lowering carbon emissions split the EU, with the coal reliant countries such as Poland complaining it will affect “jobs and competitiveness.” Up to 41,000 jobs could be lost within Poland, with the Czech Republic, Bulgaria and Romania also having a possible loss of 10,000 jobs each. Czech Prime Minister, Andrej Babiš, stated that their nation will not reach the 2050 goal “without nuclear” association. Countries are also arguing over the Just Transition Fund (JTF) that aims to help countries who are reliant on coal to become more environmentally friendly. These countries that changed their impacts prior to the Policy, such as Spain, believe that the JTF is unfair as it only benefits the countries that didn't "go green earlier." The head of Brussels' office of the Open Europe think tank, Pieter Cleppe, further dismissed the plan with sarcastic comment, “What could possibly go wrong.”

Poland's Prime Minister Mateusz Morawiecki said that the EU's carbon pricing system unfairly disadvantages poorer countries in Southern and Eastern Europe. Speaking at the COP26 climate summit in Glasgow, Czech Prime Minister Babiš denounced the European Green Deal, saying that the European Union "can achieve nothing without the participation of the largest polluters such as China or the USA that are responsible for 27 and 15 percent, respectively, of global  emissions."

Controversies

Initial European Green Deal
It has been found that American oil company ExxonMobil had a significant impact on the early negotiations of the European Green Deal. ExxonMobil attempted to change the deal in a way that puts less emphasis on the importance of reducing transport that emits carbon dioxide. This was only one of many opponents of the deal.

The European Green Deal has faced criticism from some EU member states, as well as non-governmental organizations. Greenpeace has argued that the deal is not drastic enough and that it will fail to slow down climate change to an acceptable degree. The Corporate Europe Observatory calls the Deal a positive first step, but criticizes the influence the fossil fuel industry had on it.

There has been criticism of the deal not doing enough, but also of the deal potentially being destructive to the European Union in its current state. Former Romanian president, Traian Băsescu, has warned that the deal could lead to some EU members to push towards an exit from the union. While some European states are on their way to eliminating the use of coal as a source of energy, many others still rely heavily on it. This scenario demonstrates how the deal may appeal to some states more than others. The economic impact of the deal is likely to be unevenly spread among EU states. This was highlighted by Polish MEP, Ryszard Legutko, who asked, “is the Commission trying to seize power from the member states?”. Poland, the Czech Republic and Hungary, three states that depend mostly on coal for energy, were the most opposed to the deal. Young climate activist Greta Thunberg commented on governments opposing the deal, saying "It seems to have turned into some kind of opportunity for countries to negotiate loopholes and to avoid raising their ambition".

In addition, many groups such as “Greenpeace”, “Friends of the Earth Europe” and the “Institute for European Environmental Policy” have all analysed the policy and believe it isn't “ambitious enough.” Greenpeace believes the plan is “too little too late” whilst the IEEP stated that most prospects of meeting policy objectives “lacked clear or adequate” goals for the problem areas.

The Greens-European Free Alliance and Jytte Guteland have proposed that the European Green Deal's EU 2030 climate target were to be raised to at least 65% greenhouse gas emissions reductions.

The EU has acknowledged these issues, however, and through the “Just Transition Mechanism”, expects to distribute the burden of transitioning to a greener economy more fairly. This policy means that countries that have more workers in coal and oil shale sectors, as well as those with higher greenhouse emissions, will receive more financial aid. According to Frans Timmermans, this mechanism will also make investment more accessible for those most affected, as well as offering a support package, which will be worth “at least 100 billion euros”. The Mechanism, a part of the Sustainable Europe Investment Plan, is expected to mobilize €100 billion in investments during the 2021-2027 Multiannual Financial Framework (MFF), with funding from the EU budget and Member States, as well as contributions from InvestEU and the European Investment Bank.

The Just Transition Mechanism provides a comprehensive set of support options for the most vulnerable regions. The Just Transition Fund, the first pillar, will provide €17.5 billion in EU grants available to the most affected territories, implying a national co-financing requirement of around €10 billion. The second pillar creates a specialized transition plan under InvestEU to leverage private investment. Finally, a new public sector credit facility is formed under the third pillar to leverage public finance. These measures will be accompanied by specialized advisory and technical assistance for the affected regions and projects.

The European Investment Bank Group will be able to support this through Structural Programme Loans in conjunction with European structural and investment funds (ESIF) co-financing operations.

At COP26, the European Investment Bank announced a set of just transition common principles agreed upon with multilateral development banks, which also align with the Paris Agreement. The principles refer to focusing financing on the transition to net zero carbon economies, while keeping socioeconomic effects in mind, along with policy engagement and plans for inclusion and gender equality, all aiming to deliver long-term economic transformation. Until 2030, the European Investment Bank announced that it is prepared to mobilise $1 trillion for climate action.

The African Development Bank, Asian Development Bank, Islamic Development Bank, Council of Europe Development Bank, Asian Infrastructure Investment Bank, European Bank for Reconstruction and Development, New Development Bank, and Inter-American Development Bank are among the multilateral development banks that have vowed to uphold the principles of climate change mitigation and a Just Transition. The World Bank Group also contributed.

Fossil fuels

The current proposals have been criticised for falling short of the goal of ending fossil fuels, or being sufficient for a green recovery after the COVID-19 pandemic. The European Environmental Bureau as well as the International Energy Agency (IEA) stated that fossil fuel subsidies would need to end. However, it should be stated that this can not be done until 2021, when the Energy Taxation Directive is to be revised. Also, while fossil fuels are still actively being subsidized by the EU until 2021, even during an economic recession, it is also already working on supporting electrification of vehicles and green fuels such as hydrogen.

2021 global energy crisis

Due to a combination of unfavourable conditions, which involved soaring demand of natural gas, its diminished supply from Russia and Norway to the European markets, less power generation by renewable energy sources such as wind, water and solar energy, and cold winter that left European and Russian gas reservoirs depleted, Europe faced steep increases in gas prices in 2021. Hungarian Prime Minister Viktor Orbán blamed a record-breaking surge in energy prices on the European Commission's Green Deal plans. Politico reported that "Despite the impact of high energy prices, [EU Commissioner for Energy] Simson insisted that there are no plans to backtrack on the bloc's Green Deal". European Commission President Ursula von der Leyen said that "Europe today is too reliant on gas and too dependent on gas imports. The answer has to do with diversifying our suppliers ... and, crucially, with speeding up the transition to clean energy."

Academic analysis

A meta-analysis from 2023 reported results about "required technology-level investment shifts for climate-relevant infrastructure until 2035" within the EU, and found these are "most drastic for power plants, electricity grids and rail infrastructure", ~87€ billion above the planned budgets in the near-term (2021–25), and in need of sustainable finance policies.

New European Bauhaus 
The New European Bauhaus is an artistic movement initiated by the European Commission, more precisely by the President of the European Commission, Mrs. Ursula von der Leyen herself. Its aim is to implement the European Green Deal through culture by integrating esthetics, sustainability and inclusiveness.

The New European Bauhaus (NEB) is an interdisciplinary movement which intends to re-express the fundamental ambitions of the historical Bauhaus movement generated by the German architect Walter Gropius, in order to deal with contemporary issues from the fields of creation: art, crafts, design, architecture and urban planning.

The New European Bauhaus being "new" it is currently still being developed by a multicultural and international Research Committee headed by an artist, Alexandre Dang.

However the name who has been chosen is strongly criticized in some artistic communities as being "inherently not inclusive".

Phases 
This movement wanting to be as open and accessible as possible, this will be facilitated by a planification in three phases: the Design phase (2020-2021), the Delivery phase (2021-2023+) and the Dissemination phase (2023-2024+).

The Design phase 
As a first step, the Design phase was about finding methods that could boost existing ideas related to the NEB's challenges, regarding culture and technology. These two notions are considered by the New European Bauhaus as determinant elements to face contemporary concerns, especially in architecture and urban planning sectors. By launching a call for proposals, acceleration services and financial contribution started to be provided to some projects under European Union funding programs, such as Horizon Europe or LIFE programme, but also international organisations.

In the idea of a collective design dynamic, a "High-level roundtable" has been set up with 18 thinkers and practitioners, involving for example famous architects Shigeru Ban and Bjark Ingels, the President of the Italian National Innovation Fund Francesca Bria, the activist and academic Sheela Patel, and others.

The Delivery phase 
After the Design phase, the Communication of the European Commission "New European Bauhaus Beautiful, Sustainable, Together" was released on 15 September 2021. The detailed content of this communication directly led to the Delivery phase, which began by setting up five pilots projects. These projects were selected as flagship proposals for the NEB's announced goal: "a sustainable green transformation in housing, architecture, transportation, urban, and rural spaces as part of its effort to reach carbon neutrality by 2050". In fact, one of the fundamental points of the New European Bauhaus, that is put forward by the European Commission, is to translate the European Green Deal, officially approved in 2020, to make it a tangible cultural experience in which citizens from all around the world could participate.

Referring to the major principles of the original Bauhaus movement, the NEB initiative wants to be multi-level: "from global to local, participatory and transdisciplinary". By initiating a co-design process, views and experiences of thousands of citizens, professionals and organisations across the EU, and beyond, were involved into open conversations. Emerging from this collective thinking, the three terms highlighted to define the movement are "Sustainability" (including climate goals, circularity, zero pollution and biodiversity), "Aesthetics" (quality of experience and style, beyond functionality) and "Inclusion" (including diversity first, securing accessibility and affordability). The four thematic axes chosen to guide the NEB's implementation for the next years are "Reconnecting with nature", "Regaining a sens of belonging", "Prioritising the places and people that need it most", and "Fostering long term, life cycle thinking in the industrial ecosystem". The three levels of interconnected transformations expected from the initiative are "changes in places around us", "changes in the environment that enable innovation" and "changes in the diffusion of new meanings".

The Dissemination phase 
During the Dissemination phase, the New European Bauhaus planned to focus on spreading chosen ideas and concepts to a broader audience, not only inside the EU. Within the three-phases development, this last step should be about networking and sharing knowledge between practitioners on available methods, solutions and prototypes, but also, it is meant to help creators to replicate their experiences across cities, rural areas and localities and to influence the new generation of architects and designers.

New European Bauhaus prizes 
In spring 2021, the European Commission launched New European Bauhaus prizes to reward inspiring examples of the realizations fitting the NEB principles. For the first edition of the contest, Commissioners Ferreira and Gabriel awarded 20 projects in a ceremony in Brussels on 16 September 2021.  A second edition of NEB prizes is taking place in 2022.

The NEB LAB 
The NEB LAB, or New European Bauhaus Laboratory, has been established as a meeting space to work with the New European Bauhaus growing community, which is more than 450 official partners, High-Level Roundtable members, Contact Points of the national governments, and winners and finalists of the New European Bauhaus prizes. The NEB LAB's main objective is to put the movement's thinking into practice, by co-creating and testing solutions and policy actions, like the development of labeling tools. It has started with a "Call for Friends of the New European Bauhaus", in order to get public entities, companies and political organisations involved.

The New European Bauhaus Festival 
The opening of a New European Bauhaus Festival has been announced by the European Commission to allow visibility for creators, to encourage them to "showcase" their ideas and share their progress, but also to enable networking and to foster citizen engagement. It will stand on three pillars: Fair (presentation of completed projects or products), Fest (the cultural section, with artists and performance) and Forum (debates with innovative participatory formats).

Its first edition will take place on 9–12 June 2022 in Brussels. Based on this experience, the commission will draw up a concept for a yearly event that will include places in and outside the EU from 2023 onwards.

See also
 A Green New Deal
 Build Back Better Plan
 Carbon neutrality
 COVID-19 economic recovery programmes
 Sustainable finance
 Environmental impact of agriculture
 Green economy
 Paris Agreement
 Chemicals Strategy for Sustainability Towards a Toxic-Free Environment

References

Texts

External links
A European Green Deal by the European Commission
E McGaughey, M Lawrence and Common Wealth, 'The Green Recovery Act 2020', a proposed UK law, and pdf
Green New Deal for Europe (2019) Edition II, foreword by Ann Pettifor and Bill McKibben
 New European Bauhaus official website by the European Union
 "New European Bauhaus initiative" by the European Parliament
 "New European Bauhaus initiative" by IFLA Europe - International Federation of Landscape Architects
 "WHAT IS THE NEW EUROPEAN BAUHAUS?" by Renewable Matter
 What is the New European Bauhaus? | With Xavier Troussard
 New European Bauhaus: Adaptive reuse of cultural heritage

Low-carbon economy
European Commission
European Union and the environment
European Green Deal

es:Pacto Verde Europeo